Christopher J. Taylor (June 13, 1950 – June 30, 1979) was an American super-heavyweight wrestler. He competed in freestyle and Greco-Roman events at the 1972 Summer Olympics and won a bronze medal in the freestyle. At 412 pounds (187 kg), he was the heaviest Olympian ever until the appearance of judoka Ricardo Blas Jr. in 2008 (weight limits have since been imposed).

Amateur wrestling
The 6 ft 5 in (196 cm) Taylor wrestled for Dowagiac High School in Dowagiac, Michigan, Muskegon Community College in Muskegon, Michigan, and Iowa State University (winning the NCAA heavyweight championship in 1972 and 1973 by defeating Greg Wojciechowski and Jim Hagen, respectively), and won the bronze medal at the 1972 Olympics. He lost only to Aleksandr Medved. It appeared Medved was stalling, but the referee awarded a point to the Soviet, charging Taylor with a lack of action. Later admitting that he felt sorry for Medved because of Taylor's size, the referee was dismissed from the Olympic tournament and banned from international officiating. In the Greco-Roman competition, Taylor was unexpectedly suplexed and pinned by a much lighter Wilfried Dietrich, whom he defeated a week before in the freestyle contest.

Professional wrestling career
Taylor wrestled professionally in the American Wrestling Association. His debut was in 1973 vs Rene Goulet.  Taylor faced various wrestlers, among them future star Ric Flair. Taylor, trained by Verne Gagne and Billy Robinson, was being groomed to be a major star. Chronic health problems limited the amount of work he could do, and said problems forced him to retire from the ring in 1977. He is often seen in video highlights shown at the AWA training camp, most notably in the WWE DVD releases The Spectacular Legacy Of the AWA and The Definitive Ric Flair Collection. Also appears in a clip on The Nature Boy, an ESPN 30 for 30 documentary about Ric Flair's life. He defeated Flair. 

Taylor's finishing move was a variation of the bearhug.

Personal life
On September 9, 1973, Taylor married Lynn Hart. He died of cardiovascular complications at his home in Story City, Iowa, at the age of 29, two years after health problems caused him to retire from professional wrestling. He is buried in Riverside Cemetery in Dowagiac, Michigan. The couple had one daughter.

Championships and accomplishments
National Wrestling Hall of Fame
Distinguished Member (Class of 2012)
Iowa State Wrestling Hall Of Fame 
Class of 2012
George Tragos/Lou Thesz Professional Wrestling Hall of Fame
Class of 2013

References

External links

1950 births
1979 deaths
American male professional wrestlers
Iowa State Cyclones wrestlers
Olympic bronze medalists for the United States in wrestling
People from Dowagiac, Michigan
Professional wrestlers from Iowa
Professional wrestlers from Michigan
Wrestlers at the 1972 Summer Olympics
American male sport wrestlers
20th-century American male actors
People from Story City, Iowa
Medalists at the 1972 Summer Olympics
20th-century professional wrestlers